"No More" is a song by Australian pop rock singer Cassie Davis, released to Australian radio 28 September 2009 as the fourth single from her debut album Differently. The single was released digitally and physically on 20 November 2009.

"No More" is written by Wayne Wilkins and Nina Woodford and produced by Cassie Davis.

The music video was directed by Toby Angwin, was shot in Melbourne and stars Nacho Pop from So You Think You Can Dance.

The video also features members from Cassie's live band, including her brother Joseph Davis on guitar, David Okulicz on bass and Mitch Bruzzese on drums.

Track listing
CD single
"No More" - 3:38
"Do It Again" (Acoustic) - 2:08
"Differently" (O'Lucky Remix) - 4:18
The iTunes Australia digital EP includes a bonus track, "No More" (Tom Piper & Snob Scrilla's Radio Edit) - 3:58.

Music video 
The music video for 'No More' stars Cassie Davis, her band and Nacho Pop from 'So You Think You Can Dance.' It was shot in Melbourne, Australia, and directed by Toby Angwin.

It begins with the band setting up for performance. Cassie wears a white, patterned T-shirt and short faded jeans. Her hair is out and in loose curls. Her make-up is similar to that in "Do It Again".

The shot moves to her opening her apartment door in a black shirt and torn jeans to her boyfriend, who is wearing an orange jumper. They enter the living room and sit on the sofa and talk. Days go by, and a wall fills with photographs.

Cassie is then seen singing with the band again for the chorus. At the end, more photographs are added to the wall.

The shot goes back to the apartment, where Cassie is sitting on the floor wearing black pants and a grey jumper, looking at her phone longingly. Her boyfriend walks in with a mug of tea. Cassie reaches up happily, thinking he brought it in for her. However, he passes her, sitting on the couch watching TV, and drinking the tea. Cassie's video for "Do It Again" it on the television. Cassie looks dejected and confused.

The shot goes back to the band.

A calendar shows that it is Valentine's Day. Cassie walk around in a small, black dress, impatiently waiting with phone in hand. She then runs to the door, where her boyfriend stands looking casual, and questioning why she is so dressed up. They have an argument and Cassie cries. The boyfriend walks out, leaving behind a crumpled paper heart.

The shot then reverts to the band for the chorus.

Cassie is seen sitting on the couch wearing her band outfit, and days go by. Her boyfriend enters, and they continue to argue. He dismisses her, and walks away. Cassie sits down and cries.

She is seen with the band again. The shots reverts to her on the couch in the grey jumper, looking at photographs of the boyfriend. She closes her phone, which has a picture of the boyfriend on the background. The shot then goes back to the band.

Her phone rings: it is her boyfriend. He watches her through the window. She picks up the phone, looking at it, then hanging up. The closing shot is of Cassie's profile, standing at the microphone where she sang with the band.

Charts

References

External links 
 Cassie Davis Official Blog
 bandit.fm - poparazzi - Cassie Davis
 Cassie Davis is on Facebook

2009 singles
Cassie Davis songs
Songs written by Wayne Wilkins
Songs written by Nina Woodford
2009 songs